Paura (also known as Paura 3D) is a 2012 Italian horror film directed by the Manetti Bros.

Cast
Peppe Servillo as Marchese Lanzi
Francesca Cuttica as Sabrina
Domenico Diele as Ale
Lorenzo Pedrotti as Simone
Claudio Di Biagio as Marco
Svetlana Kevral as Elena
Marco Manetti as the owner of the rehearsal room
Paolo Sassanelli as the mechanic
Antonio Tentori as the professor
Claudia Genolini as Milena 
Daniele Addei as Milena's friend

References

External links

2012 films
Films directed by the Manetti Bros.
2010s Italian-language films
2012 horror films
Italian horror films
2010s Italian films